Juan Feldman (born 16 September 1972) is a Uruguayan-born film producer and director who lives in California.

He started his film career almost by chance, as part of the crew of Curro Jiménez in Montevideo. Later he moved to California, where he engaged in film production.

Filmography
 The Prey (2015) - executive producer
 After Words (2015) - director and producer
 Costa Rican Summer (2010) - producer
 Surf School (2006) - producer
 Death to the Supermodels (2005) - producer

References

External links

1972 births
Uruguayan film producers
Uruguayan film directors
Uruguayan expatriates in the United States
Living people